Mauro-Antonio Santaromita (born 18 September 1964) is an Italian former racing cyclist. He rode in four editions of the Tour de France and ten editions of the Giro d'Italia.

His brother Ivan and son Alessandro are also professional cyclists.

Major results

1984
 3rd Giro d'Oro
1985
 1st Giro del Montalbano
1987
 4th Tour du Nord-Ouest
 8th Overall Coors Classic
1989
 1st  Overall Giro del Trentino
1990
 5th Rund um den Henninger Turm
 9th Giro del Friuli
1993
 9th Coppa Bernocchi
1995
 4th Clásica de Sabiñánigo
 7th Overall Hofbrau Cup
 8th Giro dell'Etna
1997
 1st Stage 2 (TTT) Hofbrau Cup

Grand Tour general classification results timeline

References

External links
 

1964 births
Living people
Italian male cyclists
Cyclists from Varese